Thunderbirds is a British science fiction television series created by Gerry and Sylvia Anderson, filmed by their production company AP Films (APF) and distributed by ITC Entertainment. It was made between 1964 and 1966 using a form of electronic marionette puppetry (dubbed "Supermarionation") combined with scale model special effects sequences. Two series, totalling thirty-two 50-minute episodes, were filmed; production ended with the completion of the sixth episode of the second series after Lew Grade, the Andersons' financial backer, failed in his bid to sell the programme to American network television.

Set in the 2060s, Thunderbirds is a follow-up to the earlier Supermarionation productions Four Feather Falls, Supercar, Fireball XL5 and Stingray. It follows the exploits of International Rescue, a life-saving organisation equipped with technologically advanced land, sea, air and space rescue craft; these are headed by a fleet of five vehicles named the Thunderbirds and launched from the organisation's secret base of operations in the Pacific Ocean. The main characters are ex-astronaut Jeff Tracy, leader of International Rescue, and his five adult sons, who pilot the Thunderbird machines.

Thunderbirds debuted in September 1965 on the ITV network. The series was exported to around 30 countries during the 1960s. Periodically repeated, it was adapted for radio in the 1990s and has influenced many TV programmes and other media. Besides tie-in merchandise, the series has been followed by two feature film sequels – Thunderbirds Are Go and Thunderbird 6 – as well as an anime adaptation, a mime theatre show and a live-action film. A remake series premiered in 2015; the same year, three new episodes, based on tie-in audio plays and made using the same techniques as the original series, were created to mark its 50th anniversary.

Widely regarded as the Andersons' most popular and commercially successful series, Thunderbirds has been praised for its special effects (directed by Derek Meddings) and musical score (composed by Barry Gray). It is also remembered for its title sequence, which begins with an oft-quoted countdown by Jeff Tracy voice actor Peter Dyneley: "5, 4, 3, 2, 1: Thunderbirds Are Go!"

Premise

Set between 2065 and 2067, Thunderbirds follows the exploits of the Tracy family, headed by American industrialist and ex-astronaut Jeff Tracy. Jeff is a widower with five adult sons: Scott, John, Virgil, Gordon and Alan. The Tracys make up International Rescue, a secret organisation founded to save human life. They are aided in this mission by technologically-advanced land, sea, air and space vehicles that are called into service when conventional rescue methods prove ineffective. The most important of these vehicles are the five "Thunderbird machines", each assigned to one of the five Tracy brothers:

 Thunderbird 1: a blue and silver hypersonic rocket plane used for fast response and danger zone reconnaissance. Piloted by Scott, rescue co-ordinator.
 Thunderbird 2: a green supersonic carrier aircraft that transports supporting rescue vehicles and equipment in detachable capsules called "pods". Piloted by Virgil.
 Thunderbird 3: a red single-stage-to-orbit spacecraft. Piloted alternately by Alan and John, with Scott as co-pilot.
 Thunderbird 4: a utility yellow submersible. Piloted by Gordon and usually launched from Thunderbird 2.
 Thunderbird 5: a grey and gold space station that relays distress calls from around the world. Manned alternately by "space monitors" John and Alan.

The family live on Tracy Island, International Rescue's base of operations in the South Pacific Ocean, in a luxurious villa that they share with four others: Jeff's mother, Grandma Tracy; the bespectacled scientist and engineer Brains, who designed the Thunderbirds machines; Brains' assistant Tin-Tin, who is also Alan's girlfriend; and Tin-Tin's father Kyrano, the Tracys' retainer. In this remote location, International Rescue is safe from criminals and spies who envy its technology and aim to acquire the secrets of the Thunderbird machines.

Some of International Rescue's operations are triggered by sabotage or negligence instead of accidents. For missions requiring espionage, the organisation incorporates a network of undercover agents headed by English aristocrat Lady Penelope Creighton-Ward and her butler Aloysius Parker. Based at Creighton-Ward Mansion in Kent, Penelope and Parker travel in FAB 1, a specially-modified Rolls-Royce. Members of International Rescue acknowledge orders with the expression "FAB" (a shortening of the 1960s vogue word "fabulous", but spoken like an initialism: "F-A-B").

International Rescue's most persistent opponent is master criminal the Hood. Based in a temple in the Malaysian jungle and possessing powers of hypnosis and dark magic, the Hood exerts a telepathic control over Kyrano, his estranged half-brother, and manipulates the Tracys into rescues that unfold according to his own malevolent designs. This gives him opportunities to spy on the Thunderbird machines and, by selling their secrets, make himself rich.

Production

Thunderbirds was the fourth Supermarionation puppet TV series to be produced by APF, which was founded by the husband-and-wife duo of Gerry and Sylvia Anderson (née Thamm) with their business partners Arthur Provis, Reg Hill, and John Read. Pitched in late 1963, the series was commissioned by Lew Grade of ITC, APF's parent company, on the back of the positive audience response to Stingray.

Gerry Anderson drew inspiration for the series' underlying concept from the West German mining disaster known as the Wunder von Lengede ("Miracle of Lengede"). In October 1963, the collapse of a nearby dam flooded an iron mine in the municipality of Lengede, killing 29 miners and trapping 21 others underground. Lacking the means to drill an escape shaft, the authorities were forced to requisition a heavy-duty bore from Bremen; despite the considerable time necessary to transport the bore by rail significantly reducing the chances of a successful rescue, 11 of the trapped miners were eventually saved. Recognising the advantages of swifter crisis response, Anderson conceived the idea of an "international rescue" organisation that could use supersonic aircraft to transport specialised rescue equipment quickly over long distances.

Seeking to distinguish his proposal from APF's earlier productions, Anderson attempted to pitch the stories at a level that would appeal to both adults and children. Whereas previous series had been broadcast in late-afternoon children's timeslots, Anderson wanted Thunderbirds to be shown during the evening to attract a broader family audience. Sylvia remembers that "our market had grown and a 'kidult' show ... was the next step." The Andersons retired to their holiday villa in Portugal to expand the premise, script the pilot episode and compose a writers' guide. According to Sylvia, the writing process depended on a "division of labour", whereby Gerry created the action sequences while she managed characterisation. The decision to make a father and his sons the main characters was influenced by the premise of Bonanza, as well as Sylvia's belief that the use of more than one heroic character would broaden the series' appeal. The Tracy brothers were named after Mercury Seven astronauts: Scott Carpenter, John Glenn, Virgil "Gus" Grissom, Gordon Cooper and Alan Shepard.

The series' title was derived from a letter written by Gerry's brother, Lionel, while he had been serving overseas as an RAF flight sergeant during World War II. While stationed in Arizona, Lionel had made reference to Thunderbird Field, a nearby United States Army Air Forces base. Drawn to the "punchiness" of "Thunderbirds", Anderson renamed the series, whose working title had been "International Rescue", as well as the star vehicles, which had initially been designated Rescues 1 to 5. His inspiration for the launch sequences of Thunderbirds 1, 2 and 3 originated from contemporary US Air Force launch procedure: Anderson had learnt how the Strategic Air Command would keep its pilots on permanent standby, seated in the cockpits of their aircraft and ready for take-off at a moment's notice.

In the DVD documentary The Thunderbirds Companion, Anderson explained how a rise in filming costs had made overseas distribution revenue even more important and essentially caused Thunderbirds to be made "as an American show". During the character development and voice casting process, the Andersons' main priority was to ensure that the series had transatlantic appeal, thus increasing the chances of winning an American network deal and the higher audience figures that this market had to offer.

Filming
Thunderbirds was filmed at APF's studios on the Slough Trading Estate between 1964 and 1966. In preparation, the number of full-time crew was expanded to 100. Shooting began in September 1964 after five months of pre-production. Due to the new series' technical complexity, this was a period longer than for any of the earlier productions. To speed up the filming, episodes were shot in pairs on separate stages and by separate crews (designated "A" and "B"). By 1964, APF was the UK's largest commercial user of colour film, consuming more than three million feet (570 miles or 910 kilometres) of stock per year.

As with APF's previous three series, the Andersons devised Thunderbirds as a 25-minute show. In late 1964, Alan Pattillo, a longtime writer and director for APF, was made the company's first official script editor. This move was aimed to reduce the burden on Gerry Anderson who, while reserving his producer's right to overall creative control, had grown weary of revising scripts himself. Direction of episodes was assigned in pairs: veterans Pattillo and David Elliott alternated with the less-experienced Desmond Saunders and newcomer David Lane for each month's filming. Due to the difficulties of setting up takes, progress was slow: even on a productive day, it was rare for the crew to complete more than two minutes of puppet footage. In a contemporary interview, Hill noted that Thunderbirds contained several times as many shots as a typical live-action series. He explained that rapid editing was necessary on account of the characters' lack of facial expression, which made it difficult to sustain the viewer's interest for more than a few seconds per shot.

After viewing the finished pilot, "Trapped in the Sky", Lew Grade was so impressed with the series that he instructed Anderson to extend the length of each episode from 25 to 50 minutes – enough to fill an hour-long commercial timeslot. He also increased the budget per episode from £25,000 to £38,000. As a result, Thunderbirds became not only APF's longest and highest-budgeted production, but also one of the most expensive TV series ever made up to that point. The total budget for the 26-episode Series One was approximately £1 million (about £ million in ).

The production, which had been shooting two 25-minute episodes every two weeks, faced great challenges transitioning to the new format: nine episodes had already been fully or partly filmed, scripts for ten more had been written, and major rewrites would be needed to satisfy the longer running time. Anderson lamented: "Our time-scale was far too drawn out. ITC's New York office insisted that they should have one show a fortnight ... Everything had to move at twice the speed." APF spent over seven months extending the existing episodes and filmed the new 50-minute format at a rate of two episodes every four weeks.

Tony Barwick, who had impressed Pattillo and the Andersons with an unsubmitted script that he had written for Danger Man, was recruited to assist in writing subplots and filler material. He found that the longer format created opportunities to strengthen the characterisation. Science fiction writer John Peel suggests that "small character touches" make the puppet cast of Thunderbirds "much more rounded" than those of earlier APF series. He compares the writing favourably to that of live-action drama. The new footage proved useful during the development of the first series finale, "Security Hazard": since the previous two episodes ("Attack of the Alligators!" and "The Cham-Cham") had overspent their budgets, Pattillo devised a flashback-dominated clip show containing only 17 minutes of new material to reduce costs.

Filming of Series One was completed in December 1965. A second series was also commissioned late that year and entered production in March 1966. Barwick became a full-time member of the writing staff and took over the role of script editor from the outgoing Pattillo. The main puppet cast and vehicles were rebuilt; in addition, the art department expanded some of the standing sets, including the Tracy Villa lounge and the Thunderbird 5 control room. To accommodate the simultaneous filming of the TV series and Thunderbirds Are Go, APF purchased two more buildings on the Slough Trading Estate and converted them into new stages. As personnel and studio space were divided between the two productions, filming of the TV series progressed at half the previous speed, with B crew shooting one episode a month. Filming on Thunderbirds Are Go was completed by June, allowing A crew to resume work on the series to shoot what would prove to be its penultimate episode, "Ricochet".

Production of Thunderbirds ended in August 1966 with the completion of the sixth episode of Series Two. In February that year, it had been reported that Grade had been unable to sell the series in the United States due to disagreements over timeslots. In July, he cancelled Thunderbirds after failing in his second attempt to secure an American buyer. The three major US networks of the time—NBC, CBS and ABC—had all bid for the series, with Grade repeatedly increasing the price. When NBC withdrew its offer, the other two immediately followed.

By the time of its cancellation, Thunderbirds had become widely popular in the UK and was being distributed extensively overseas. Grade, however, believed that without the financial boost of an American network sale, a full second series would fail to recover its production costs. He therefore asked Anderson to devise a new concept that he hoped would stand a greater chance of winning over the profitable US market. This became Captain Scarlet and the Mysterons.

Casting and characters

Dialogue recording sessions were supervised by the Andersons and Reg Hill, with Sylvia Anderson in charge of casting. Dialogue was recorded once per month at a rate of two scripts per session. Supporting parts were not assigned, but negotiated by the cast among themselves. Two recordings would be made at each session: one to be converted into electronic pulses for the puppet filming, the other to be added to the soundtrack during post-production. The tapes were edited at Gate Recording Theatre in Birmingham.

In the interest of transatlantic appeal, it was decided that the main characters would be mostly American and therefore actors capable of producing an appropriate accent were used. British, Canadian and Australian actors formed most of the voice cast; the only American involved was stage actor David Holliday, who was noticed in London's West End and given the part of Virgil Tracy. Following the completion of the first series, Holliday returned to the US. The character was voiced by English actor Jeremy Wilkin for Thunderbirds Are Go, Series Two and Thunderbird 6.

British actor David Graham was among the first to be cast. He had previously voiced characters in Four Feather Falls, Supercar, Fireball XL5 and Stingray. Beyond the APF productions, he had supplied one of the original Dalek voices on Doctor Who. Cast alongside Graham was Australian actor Ray Barrett. Like Graham, he had worked for the Andersons before, having voiced Titan and Commander Shore in Stingray. A veteran of radio drama, Barrett was skilled at performing a range of voices and accents in quick succession. Villains of the week would typically be voiced by either Barrett or Graham. Aware of the sensitive political climate of the Cold War and not wishing to "perpetuate the idea that Russia was the enemy with a whole generation of children watching", Gerry Anderson decided the Hood (voiced by Barrett) should be Oriental and placed his temple hideout in Malaysia to defy the viewer's expectations.

Although Lady Penelope and Parker (the latter voiced by Graham) were among the first characters developed, neither was conceived as a major role. Parker's Cockney manner was based on a waiter at a pub in Cookham that was sometimes visited by the crew. On Gerry Anderson's recommendation, Graham dined there regularly to study the accent. Anderson's first choice for the role of Penelope had been Fenella Fielding, but Sylvia insisted she take the part herself. Her Penelope voice was intended to emulate Fielding and Joan Greenwood. On Penelope and Parker's secondary role as comic relief, Gerry explained, "We British can laugh at ourselves, so therefore we had Penelope and Parker as this comedy team. And in America they love the British aristocracy too.'"

As well as Jeff Tracy, English-Canadian actor Peter Dyneley voiced the recurring character of Commander Norman, chief of air traffic control at London International Airport. His supporting character voices were typically those of upper-class Englishmen. Shane Rimmer, the voice of Scott, was cast on the strength of his performance on the BBC soap opera Compact. Meanwhile, fellow Canadian Matt Zimmerman was selected at a late stage in the process. The expatriate West End actor was given the role of Alan on the recommendation of his friend, Holliday: "They were having great difficulty casting the part of Alan as they wanted a certain sound for him, being the youngest brother. David, who [was] a bit older than I am, told them that he had this friend, me, who would be great."

Christine Finn, known for her role in the TV serial Quatermass and the Pit, provided the voices of Tin-Tin Kyrano and Grandma Tracy. With Sylvia Anderson, she was also responsible for voicing most of the female and child supporting characters. Supporting parts were occasionally voiced by John Tate, Paul Maxwell and Charles Tingwell; the latter two joined the cast in Series Two following their contributions to Thunderbirds Are Go. None of these three actors were credited for their performances.

Design and effects
Bob Bell, assisted by Keith Wilson and Grenville Nott, headed the art department for Series One. During the simultaneous filming of Series Two and Thunderbirds Are Go in 1966, Bell attended mainly to the film, entrusting set design for the TV series to Wilson.

Since it was necessary for the art department's interior sets to conform to the special effects department's exterior plans, each team closely monitored the other's work. According to Sylvia Anderson, Bell's challenge was to produce complex interiors on a limited budget while resisting the effects department's push for "more extravagant" design. This task was complicated by the unnatural proportions of the puppets: Bell struggled to decide whether the sets should be built to a scale proportionate to their bodies or their oversized heads and hands. He used the example of FAB 1 to illustrate the problem: "As soon as we positioned [the puppets] standing alongside [the model], they looked ridiculous, as the car towered over them." He ultimately adopted a "mix-and-match" approach, in which smaller items, such as tableware, were scaled to their hands and furniture to their bodies.

While designing the Creighton-Ward Mansion sets, Bell and his staff strove for authenticity, ordering miniature Tudor paintings, -scale Georgian- and Regency-style furniture and carpeting in the shape of a polar bear skin. This realism was enhanced by adding scrap items acquired from household waste and electronics shops. For example, a vacuum cleaner pipe serves as Virgil Tracy's launch chute.

Puppets
The head puppet sculptors were Christine Glanville and Mary Turner, who also served as the lead puppeteers. Glanville and Turner's team built the 13 members of the main cast in six months at a cost of between £250 and £300 per puppet (about £ and £ in ). Since pairs of episodes were being filmed simultaneously on separate stages, the characters needed to be sculpted in duplicate. Facial expressions were diversified by means of replaceable heads: as well as a head with a neutral expression, each main character was given a "smiler", a "frowner" and a "blinker".

The puppets were made up of more than 30 individual components, the most important of which was the solenoid that synchronised lip movements with the characters' pre-recorded dialogue. This device was positioned inside the head unit; consequently, torsos and limbs appeared relatively small. The puppets' likenesses and mechanics are remembered favourably by puppeteer Wanda Brown, who preferred the Thunderbirds marionettes over the accurately-proportioned ones that first appeared in Captain Scarlet: "The puppets were easier to operate and more enjoyable because they had more character to them ... Even some of the more normal-looking faces, such as Scott and Jeff, for me had more character than the puppets in the series that came afterwards." Rimmer speaks positively of the puppets' still being "very much caricatures", since it made them "more lovable and appealing ... There was a naive quality about them and nothing too complex."

The appearances of the main characters were inspired by those of actors and other entertainers, who were typically selected from the show business directory Spotlight. According to Glanville, as part of a trend away from the strong caricature of previous series, APF was seeking "more natural faces" for the puppets. The face of Jeff Tracy was based on that of Lorne Greene, Scott on Sean Connery, Alan on Robert Reed, John on Adam Faith and Charlton Heston, Brains on Anthony Perkins and Parker on Ben Warriss. Sylvia Anderson brought the character of Penelope to life in likeness as well as voice: after her test moulds were rejected, sculptor Mary Turner decided to use Anderson herself as a template.

Main character heads were initially sculpted in either Plasticine or clay. Once the general aspect had been finalised, this served as the template for a silicone rubber mould. This was coated with Bondaglass (fibreglass mixed with resin) and enhanced with Bondapaste, a putty-like substance, to accentuate contours. The Bondaglass shell was then fitted with a solenoid, leather mouth parts and plastic eyes, as well as incisor teeth—a first for a Supermarionation production. Puppets known as "revamps", which had plastic heads, portrayed the supporting characters. These marionettes started their working lives with only a mouth and eyes; their faces were remoulded from one episode to the next. Particularly striking revamp moulds were retained and, as their numbers increased, photographed to compile an internal casting directory.

Wigs were made of mohair or, in the case of the Penelope puppet, human hair. Puppet bodies were built in three sizes: "large male" (specifically for the Tracys and the Hood), "small male" and "small female". Sylvia Anderson, the head costume designer, devised the main characters' attire. To give the puppets increased mobility, the costume department generally avoided stiff synthetic materials, instead working with cotton, silk and wool. Between 1964 and 1966, the department's stock numbered more than 700 costumes.

Each puppet's head was fitted with around ten thin tungsten steel wires. During the filming, dialogue was played into the studio using modified tape recorders that converted the feed into electronic pulses. Two of the wires relayed these pulses to the internal solenoid, completing the Supermarionation process. The wires, which were sprayed black to reduce their visibility, were made even less noticeable through the application of powder paint that matched the background colours of the set. Glanville explained the time-consuming nature of this process: "[The puppeteers] used to spend over half an hour on each shot getting rid of these wires, looking through the camera, puffing a bit more [paint] here, anti-flare there; and, I mean, it's very depressing when somebody will say to us, 'Of course the wires showed.'" Positioned on an overhead gantry with a hand-held cruciform, the puppeteers co-ordinated movements with the help of a viewfinder-powered CCTV feedback system. As filming progressed, the crew started to dispense with wires and instead manipulate the puppets from the studio floor using rods.

Due to their low weight and the fact that they had only one control wire per leg, the puppets were unable to walk convincingly. Therefore, scenes involving movement were filmed from the waist up, with a puppeteer holding the legs below the level of the camera and using a "bobbing" action to simulate motion. Alternatively, dynamic shots were eliminated altogether: in an interview with New Scientist, director of photography John Read spoke of the advantages of circumventing the lack of agility so that the puppets "appear, for example, to walk through doors (although the control wires make this impossible) or pick up a coffee cup (although their fingers are not in fact jointed)." Live-action shots of human hands were inserted whenever scripts called for more dexterous actions to be performed.

Special effects
The scale model effects for every APF series from Supercar to UFO were directed by Derek Meddings, who later worked on the James Bond and Superman films. Knowing that Thunderbirds would be the "biggest project [APF] had worked on", Meddings found himself struggling to manage his workload with the single filming unit that had produced all the effects for Stingray. He therefore established a second unit under technician Brian Johncock, and a third exclusively for filming airborne sequences. This expansion increased the number of APF crews and stages to five each. A typical episode contained around 100 effects shots and Meddings' team completed up to 18 per day.

An addition to the effects department was Mike Trim, who served as Meddings' assistant in designing vehicles and buildings. Meddings and Trim jointly pioneered an "organic" design technique in which the exteriors of models and sets were customised with parts from model kits and children's toys. Models and sets were also "dirtied down" with powder paint or pencil lead to create a used look. Toy cars and vans were used in long shot, while scale vehicles were equipped with basic steering and suspension for added realism. Miniature fans and Jetex pellets, which are capable of issuing air jets or chemical exhaust, were attached to the undersides to simulate dust trails. Another of Meddings' inventions was a closed, cyclical effects stage nicknamed the "rolling road": consisting of two or more loops of canvas running at different speeds, this device allowed shots of moving vehicles to be filmed on a static set to make more efficient use of the limited studio space. Airborne aircraft sequences were mounted against a "rolling sky", with smoke fanned across to simulate passing clouds.

One of Meddings' first tasks was to shoot stock footage of the Thunderbird machines and the series' main locations, Tracy Island and Creighton-Ward Mansion. The finished island model was a composite of more than a dozen smaller sets that could be detached from the whole and filmed separately. The architecture of the mansion was based on that of Stourhead House, located on the Stourhead Estate in Wiltshire. In the absence of head designer Reg Hill, who was serving as associate producer, Meddings was further tasked with designing the Thunderbird fleet and FAB 1. Scale models for the six main vehicles were built by a contractor, Master Models of Middlesex. Models and puppet sets combined, more than 200 versions of the Thunderbird machines were created for the series.

During the designing and filming process, Meddings' first priorities were realism and credibility. With the exception of Thunderbird 5, each vehicle was built in three or four scales. Meddings' swing-wing concept for Thunderbird 1 was inspired by his wish to create something "more dynamic" than a fixed-wing aircraft. He remained unsatisfied with the prototype of Thunderbird 2 until he inverted the wings, later commenting, "... at the time, all aircraft had swept-back wings. I only did it to be different." This decision was made out of personal preference and was not informed by any expert knowledge on Meddings' part. He described the Thunderbird 2 launch as "probably the most memorable" sequence that his team devised for an APF production.

Thunderbird 4 was particularly difficult to film: as the scale of the model did not correspond to the water inside the shooting tank, creative camera angles and rapid editing were used to produce a sense of realistic perspective. Thunderbird 5, the most difficult vehicle for Meddings to visualise, was based on the Tracy Island Round House. Since most of the space station's appearances were provided by stock footage, the model was rarely filmed. Pod Vehicles were designed on an episode-by-episode basis and built from balsa wood, Jelutong wood or fibreglass. To save time and costs, other minor vehicles were built in-house from radio-controlled model kits.

As the puppets of Lady Penelope and Parker needed to fit inside, the largest of all the models was the seven-foot FAB 1, which cost £2,500 (about £ in ) to build. The Rolls-Royce's name and colour were both chosen by Sylvia Anderson. Rolls-Royce Limited supervised the construction of the plywood model and supplied APF with an authentic radiator grille for close-up shots of the front of the car. In exchange for its cooperation, the company requested that a Spirit of Ecstasy be fixed to the chassis and that the characters avoid referring to the brand with abbreviations such as "Rolls".

Scale explosions were created using substances such as fuller's earth, petrol gel, magnesium strips and Cordtex explosive. They were originally filmed at up to 120 frames per second (f.p.s.), so that when slowed down to the regular 24 f.p.s., their apparent magnitude and length would be increased. Gunpowder canisters were ignited to create rocket jets. The wires that electronically fired the rockets also allowed a member of the crew, holding a cruciform and positioned on an overhead gantry, to "fly" the model over the set. By far the most unwieldy model was Thunderbird 2, which Meddings remembered as being "awful" to fly. A combination of unreliable rockets and weak wiring frequently caused problems: should the former be slow to ignite, the current quickly caused the latter to overheat and snap, potentially damaging the model and even setting fire to the set. Conditions above the studio floor were often dangerous due to the heat and smoke. Although many of the exhaust sound effects used in the series were drawn from an audio library, some were specially recorded during a Red Arrows display at RAF Little Rissington in Gloucestershire.

By 1966, Meddings' commitments were split between Series Two and Thunderbirds Are Go. While Meddings worked on the film, camera operator Jimmy Elliott assumed the responsibility of directing the TV effects. By this stage, the basic frame of Thunderbird 2 had been damaged so many times that the model had needed to be rebuilt from scratch. Meddings was displeased with the result, reflecting that the replacement was "not only the wrong colour, it was a completely different shape ... I never felt our model-makers managed to recapture the look of the original."

Critic David Garland suggests that the challenge facing the Thunderbirds effects department was to strike a balance between the "conventional science fiction imperative of the 'futuristic'" and the "seeping hyper-realist concerns mandated by the Andersons' approach to the puppets". Thunderbirds has been praised for the quality of its effects. Jim Sangster and Paul Condon, writers of Collins Telly Guide, consider the model work "uniformly impressive". To Paul Cornell, Martin Day and Keith Topping, writers of The Guinness Book of Classic British TV, the effects are "way beyond anything seen on TV previously". Impressed by their work on Thunderbirds, film director Stanley Kubrick hired several members of Meddings' staff to supervise the effects shooting for 2001: A Space Odyssey.

Title sequence

The series' title sequence, storyboarded by Gerry Anderson, is made up of two parts. It opens with a countdown of "5, 4, 3, 2, 1: Thunderbirds Are Go!", provided by Dyneley in character as Jeff Tracy. In a departure from the style of Stingray, the Thunderbirds title sequence varies with each episode: the first part consists of an action montage that serves as a preview of the plot. Simon Archer and Marcus Hearn, biographers of Gerry Anderson, compare this device favourably to a film trailer.

The second part, accompanied by composer Barry Gray's "The Thunderbirds March", features portraits of the main puppet cast superimposed on various vehicles and settings. Peel describes this as "ostensibly a return to the 'series stars' concept long known in TV", while Garland considers such imagery demonstrative of Anderson's commitment to "incremental realism" through a convergence of human and puppet characteristics. Essayist Jonathan Bignell suggests that the use of portraits conveys Anderson's partiality to "visual revelation of machines and physical action".

According to Daniel O'Brien, writer of SF:UK: How British Science Fiction Changed the World, the Thunderbirds title sequence encapsulates the reasons for the series' enduring popularity. Dyneley's countdown is particularly well remembered and has been widely quoted. Dean Newman of the Syfy channel website ranks Thunderbirds eighth in a list of "Top 10 TV title sequences", while Den of Geek's Martin Anderson considers the sequence the best of any TV series.

Music

The score was composed by Gray, who served as musical director for all of the Anderson productions up to the first series of Space: 1999. In response to Gerry Anderson's request that the main theme have a "military feel", Gray produced a brass-dominated piece titled "The Thunderbirds March", which was recorded in December 1964 at Olympic Studios in London. The end titles were originally to have been accompanied by "Flying High", a lyrical track sung by Gary Miller with backing by Ken Barrie. Ultimately, a variation of the march was used instead. Incidental music was recorded over nine months between March and December 1965. As most of the music budget was spent on the series' earlier episodes, later instalments drew heavily on APF's ever-expanding music library.

Peel considers "The Thunderbirds March" to be "one of the best TV themes ever written—perfect for the show and catchy when heard alone". Morag Reavley of BBC Online argues that the piece is "up there ... in the quintessential soundtrack of the Sixties" with the James Bond films and the songs of Frank Sinatra, Elvis and The Beatles. More generally, he praises the series' "catchy, pulse-quickening tunes", as well as Gray's aptitude for "musical nuance" and the mixing of genres. Heather Phares of Allmusic considers "Thunderbirds Are Go!"—the track accompanying the launch sequences of Thunderbirds 1, 2 and 3—to be a reflection of the mod aspect of 1960s British spy fiction. She also highlights Gray's homage to—and divergence from—musical norms, commenting that his score "sends up the spy and action/adventure conventions of the '60s very stylishly and subtly".

David Huckvale identifies Wagnerian homage in both the theme music and the series' premise. Noting that the theme's opening string ostinato is similar in effect to a recurring motif in Ride of the Valkyries, he also likens the Thunderbird machines to Valkyries themselves: "Their function is more benevolent than those warrior maidens, but they do hover over danger, death and destruction." Kevin J. Donnelly of the University of Southampton acknowledges the series' "big-sounding orchestral score", which he compares to that of a live-action film. He also suggests that the music serves partly to draw attention away from the physical imperfections of the puppets.

Broadcast history
The first episode of Thunderbirds premiered on 30 September 1965 on the ATV Midlands, Westward and Channel franchises of the ITV network. Transmissions by other franchises, including ATV London and Granada, began the following month. Honouring the Andersons' wish for family appeal, many areas showed the series during prime time (typically in a 7.00 p.m. slot). The final episode, the Christmas-themed "Give or Take a Million", was first broadcast on 25 December 1966. Like other British series filmed in colour in the mid-1960s, Thunderbirds was first screened in its home market in black and white, colour broadcasting not starting on the main channels of BBC1 and ITV until November 1969.

Despite Grade's decision to double the running time, Thunderbirds was also sold in a two-part, 25-minute episode format. Each "concluding" part began with a narration by Shane Rimmer summarising the first part's action. Granada first showed the series in this format, airing both episode parts on the same night (one before and one after the ITN Evening News). It broadcast the original format for the first time when it began repeats in 1966. In 1968, the franchise briefly screened episodes in three parts due to timeslot restrictions. In the Midlands, ATV broadcast Series One in the hour-long format; Series Two, along with repeats of Series One, was then shown in the two-part format on consecutive evenings. The availability of re-runs varied greatly. ATV Midlands hosted regular repeats into the early 1970s; by contrast, between 1968 and 1976 Yorkshire Television showed no episodes at all. The series was last transmitted on the ITV network in 1981.

In 1990, eight of the 19 audio episodes were turned into radio dramas for broadcast on BBC Radio 5. The radio series was a success and prompted the BBC to acquire the rights to the TV episodes, which it aired on BBC2 (in all UK regions simultaneously) from September 1991. After this first run, which averaged more than six million viewers per episode, the BBC repeated the series six times: from 1992 to 1993 (Series One only), 1994 to 1995 (nine episodes only), 2000 to 2001 (in remastered form), and 2003, 2005 and 2006. Other channels to have shown the series include UK Gold (from 1994 to 1995), Bravo (1996–97), Cartoon Network (2001–02), Boomerang (2001–03) and Syfy (2009). In Scotland, the BBC aired a Gaelic dub, Tairnearan Tar As ("Thunderbirds Are Go") in 1993 and 1994.

During the 1960s, Thunderbirds was distributed in about 30 countries including the Netherlands, Canada, Australia and Japan. International advance sales totalled £350,000 (about £ million in ). In Japan, where it was first broadcast by NHK, Thunderbirds acquired a significant fan following and influenced the series Ultraman, Mighty Jack, Himitsu Sentai Gorenger, Super Rescue Solbrain and Neon Genesis Evangelion. In the US, the 25-minute format was placed in first-run syndication in 1968 to modest success. Internationally, the series has also been broadcast by TechTV, G4 and Family Room HD (US), BBC Kids and YTV (Canada), Nine Network and Foxtel (Australia), TV3 (New Zealand), MediaCorp TV12 (Singapore) and RTÉ Two (Republic of Ireland).

Reception
Thunderbirds is generally considered the Andersons' most popular series and their greatest critical and commercial success. In 1966, the Royal Television Society awarded the series a Silver Medal for Outstanding Artistic Achievement. In 2007, Thunderbirds came 19th in a Radio Times poll for the best science fiction TV programme of all time, and in 2013, it was ranked fourth in the Channel 5 list show 50 Greatest Kids' TV Shows. Acknowledging the series' "enduring appeal for both young and old", Robert Sellers remarks that "the cult of Thunderbirds has grown to near-mythic proportions."

For Peel, Thunderbirds is "without a doubt the peak of the Supermarionation achievement". Suggesting that the series is pitched at a "more adult" level than its predecessors, he adds that its sense of adventure, effective humour and "gripping and convincing" episodes ensured that "everyone in the audience found something to love about it." Simon Heffer, a fan of Thunderbirds in childhood, commented positively on the series for The Daily Telegraph in 2011: "All the elements we children discerned in whatever grown-up television we had been allowed to watch were present in Thunderbirds: dramatic theme and incidental music; well-developed plots; goodies and baddies; swaggering Americans, at a time when the whole of Britain was in a cultural cringe to them; and, of course, glamorous locations ... Then, of course, there was the nail-biting tension of the rescues themselves ..." Film critic Kim Newman describes the series as a "television perennial".

In his foreword to John Marriott's book, Thunderbirds Are Go!, Anderson put forward several explanations for the series' lasting success: it "contains elements that appeal to most children—danger, jeopardy and destruction. But because International Rescue's mission is to save life, there is no gratuitous violence." According to Anderson, Thunderbirds incorporates a "strong family atmosphere, where Dad reigns supreme". Both O'Brien and script editor Alan Pattillo have praised the series' positive "family values". In addition, Heffer and others have written of its cross-generational appeal. In 2000, shortly before the series' BBC revival, Brian Viner remarked in Radio Times that Thunderbirds was on the point of "captivating yet another generation of viewers". Stuart Hood, writing for The Spectator in 1965, praised Thunderbirds as a "modern fairy tale"; adding that it "can sometimes be frightening", he recommended that children watch it accompanied by their parents. Writing for Dreamwatch in 1994, Andrew Thomas described Thunderbirds as only "nominally" a children's programme: "Its themes are universal and speak as much to the adult in the child as the child in the adult."

Jeff Evans, author of The Penguin TV Companion, argues that the series' 50-minute format allows for stronger character development and "tension-building". O'Brien is less positive in his appraisal of the writing, asserting that the plots are often "formulaic" and are sometimes "stretched to snapping point" by the extended running time. Cornell, Day and Topping are critical: they consider the writing at times "woefully poor" and argue that Thunderbirds as a whole is "often as clichéd as previous Anderson series". Peel, despite praising the storylines and characterisation, suggests that the "tongue-in-cheek" humour of Stingray is less evident. Where Thunderbirds improves on its predecessor, Peel believes, is in its rejection of fantasy plot devices, child and animal characters, comical and stereotyped villains and what he terms the "standard Anderson sexism": female characters, marginalised in earlier series, are more commonly seen to play active and sometimes heroic roles.

Noting the attention to detail of the series' launch sequences, Jonathan Bignell argues that part of the motivation for dedicating large amounts of screen time to the Thunderbird craft is the need to compensate for the limited mobility of the puppet cast. The focus on futuristic machines has also been explored by cultural historian Nicholas J. Cull, who comments that of all the Andersons' series, Thunderbirds is the most evocative of a recurring theme: the "necessity of the human component of the machine", whereby the failures of new technology are overcome by "brave human beings and technology working together". This makes the series' vision of the 2060s "wonderfully humanistic and reassuring". O'Brien similarly praises this optimism, comparing the Tracy family to guardian Übermensch. Writing for Wired UK magazine, Warren Ellis asserts that the series' scientific vision could inspire the next generation of "mad and frightening engineers", adding that Thunderbirds "trades in vast, demented concepts ... immense and very beautiful ideas as solutions to problems."

Thomas argues that the world of Thunderbirds is similar to the 1960s to the extent that contemporary capitalism and class structures appear to have survived mostly intact. He also observes, however, that wealth and high social status are often depicted as character flaws rather than strengths. According to Thomas, a contributing factor to the series' lasting popularity is the realism of International Rescue's machines. Newman, for his part, suggests that "the point isn't realism. The 21st century of Thunderbirds is detailed ... but also de-populated, a high-tech toyland". He is more negative in his comparisons of contemporary and future values, noting the "square, almost 50s" attitudes to race, gender and class. With regard to stereotyping, Hood comments that he "would be happier if [villains] didn't seem to be recognisable by their pigmentation". Cull, by contrast, considers the series largely progressive on the subject of race, arguing that it rejects negative stereotyping through the use of "positive non-white characters" such as Kyrano and Tin-Tin. However, he deems many of the one-off villains derivative, commenting that these characters are typically presented as "corrupt businessmen, spivs and gangsters familiar from crime films".

Various commentators—including Bignell, Cull and O'Brien—have also discussed Thunderbirds as a product of the Cold War era. Bignell comments that the Hood's Oriental appearance and mysterious powers draw parallels with James Bond villains and fears of China operating as "a 'third force' antagonistic to the West". Cull observes that, despite the series' focus on the dangers of nuclear technology, the Thunderbird machines contradict this particular theme: in their case, "an image of technology associated with the threat of Cold War mass destruction—the rocket emerging from the hidden silo—was appropriated and deployed to save life rather than to take it." He argues that the series adheres more closely to cultural norms by drawing on the "Cold War cult of the secret agent whose skills defend the home from enemies unknown", noting Lady Penelope's role as a spy in addition to two episodes ("30 Minutes After Noon" and "The Man from MI.5") that are heavily influenced by the James Bond novels and film adaptations.

The series' presentation of smoking was the subject of a study published in the medical journal Tobacco Control in 2002. Despite identifying examples in 26 episodes, Kate Hunt of the University of Glasgow concluded that Thunderbirds does not actively promote smoking—a view opposed by the Roy Castle Lung Cancer Foundation (RCLCF) at the time of the series' relaunch on BBC2. Rejecting the RCLCF's proposal that the remastered episodes be edited to digitally erase all visible cigarettes and cigars, the BBC stated that the series "does not glorify or encourage smoking" and described the activity as "incidental to the plot".

During a 2001 exhibition dedicated to the series, Masaaki Hirakata, curator at the Tokyo Metropolitan Museum of Photography, likened Thunderbirds to "a modern sci-fi expression of bunraku, which probably explains why it was accepted so readily [in Japan]".

Merchandise

A comic strip featuring the characters of Lady Penelope and Parker debuted in the early issues of the children's weekly TV Century 21 in 1965. A full-length Thunderbirds strip appeared a year later, after which the Lady Penelope adventures were given a comic of their own. The Thunderbirds strip in TV Century 21 (later named TV21) ran from January 1966 to June 1970; it was originally by Alan Fennell and Frank Bellamy, with subsequent contributors including Scott Goodall, Don Harley and John Cooper. It was reprinted in Polystyle Publications' Countdown comic in 1971 and 1972.

More than 3,000 Thunderbirds-themed products have been marketed since the series' first appearance. To accommodate the high demand for tie-ins, APF established three dedicated subsidiaries: APF Merchandising, APF Music and APF Toys. Due to the series' popularity, some British commentators dubbed the 1966 end-of-year shopping season "Thunderbirds Christmas". In the early 1990s, Matchbox launched a new toy range to coincide with the BBC2 repeats. Sales figures for Christmas 1992 surpassed those attained by Star Wars merchandise in the 1970s and 1980s. Demand for Matchbox's Tracy Island Playset overwhelmed supply, leading to shop fights and a substantial black market for the toy.

From 1965 to 1967, APF released 19 Thunderbirds audio plays on vinyl EP records. Three were original stories; the rest were condensed re-tellings of various TV episodes narrated by the regular characters. The late 1960s also saw the publication of Thunderbirds, Lady Penelope, and Captain Scarlet and Thunderbirds annuals as well as eight original Thunderbirds novels. In 2008, FTL Publications of Minnesota launched a new series of tie-in novels.

The series' first tie-in video game, developed by Firebird Software for the Commodore 64 and ZX Spectrum computers, was released in 1985. Since then,  titles have been released for the Game Boy Color, Game Boy Advance and PlayStation 2. In the late 1980s, Thunderbirds was released on home video for the first time by PolyGram and its subsidiary Channel 5. Following its acquisition by Carlton in 1999, the series was digitally remastered for the release of the first DVD versions in 2000. Blu-ray editions followed in 2008.

An official Thunderbirds board game was published in 2015. It was designed by Matt Leacock, designer of the Pandemic board game. Three expansions of the core game were published in 2016: Above & Beyond, The Hood, and Tracy Island.

Later productions

Thunderbirds has been followed by two film sequels, a live-action film adaptation, two animated TV remakes and several re-edited presentations for TV and home video. The second of the remakes, Thunderbirds Are Go, premiered on ITV in 2015, the 50th anniversary year of the original.

Film
The feature film sequels Thunderbirds Are Go and Thunderbird 6 were released in 1966 and 1968. Lew Grade had approved the production of the first film before the TV series began to air. Written and produced by the Andersons and directed by David Lane, the films were distributed by United Artists. Both were critical and commercial failures, and plans for further sequels were abandoned.

In the early 1980s, episodes of Thunderbirds and other Supermarionation series were re-edited by ITC's New York offices to create a series of compilation films. Branded "Super Space Theater", this format was mainly intended for family viewing on American syndicated and cable TV. Three Thunderbirds features were produced: Thunderbirds to the Rescue, Thunderbirds in Outer Space and Countdown to Disaster.

Plans for a live-action film adaptation were first announced in 1993. These eventually culminated in the 2004 film Thunderbirds, directed by Jonathan Frakes and produced by StudioCanal and Working Title Films. It was a critical and commercial failure and poorly received by fans of the TV series.

TV
The Andersons sold their intellectual and profit participation rights to Thunderbirds and their other productions in the 1970s. As a result, they had no developmental control over later adaptations of their works. Thunderbirds was first remade for TV in the early 1980s as Thunderbirds 2086. In this anime re-imagining, set 20 years after the original, the vastly expanded International Rescue is based within an arcology and operates 17 Thunderbird machines. It was inspired by Thunderhawks, an updated story concept by Gerry Anderson and Reg Hill that later served as the basis for Anderson's Terrahawks.

Two re-edited series, based on condensed versions of 13 of the original episodes, aired in the US in 1994. The first, Thunderbirds USA, was broadcast as part of the Fox Kids programming block; the second, Turbocharged Thunderbirds, was syndicated by UPN. Devised as a comedy, Turbocharged Thunderbirds moved the action to the planet "Thunder-World" and combined the original puppet footage with new live-action scenes featuring a pair of human teenagers.

As well as Thunderhawks, Anderson developed other ideas for a remake. A 1976 concept, Inter-Galactic Rescue 4, was to have featured a variable-configuration craft capable of performing rescues on land and sea, in air and in space; Anderson pitched the idea to NBC, who rejected it. This was followed in 1984 by another proposed re-imagining, T-Force, which Anderson was at first unable to pursue due to a lack of funding. Development resumed in 1993, when it was decided to produce the series, now titled GFI, using cel animation. However, Anderson was disappointed with the results and the production was abandoned.

In 2005, Anderson re-affirmed his wish to remake Thunderbirds but stated that he had been unable to secure the necessary rights from Granada Ventures. His negotiations with Granada and its successor, ITV plc, continued for the next few years. In 2008, he expressed his commitment to creating an "updated" version, ideally using CGI; three years later, he announced that work on the new series had commenced. Following Anderson's death in December 2012, it was confirmed that ITV Studios and Pūkeko Pictures had struck a deal to remake Thunderbirds using a combination of CGI and live-action model sets. The new series, Thunderbirds Are Go, premiered in 2015.

Later that year, to mark the series' 50th anniversary, ITV commissioned Pod 4 Films to produce a mini-series of new Thunderbirds episodes based on three of the 1960s audio plays. Funding was obtained through Kickstarter and the mini-series had its premiere screening at the BFI Southbank in 2016. Titled The Anniversary Episodes, it was released on BritBox in 2020 alongside all 32 episodes of the original Thunderbirds.

Audio
In April 2021, Big Finish Productions announced the launch of a new series of audiobooks based on the Anderson productions. The first of these, Thunderbirds: Terror from the Stars (an adaptation of the 1966 tie-in novel Thunderbirds by John Theydon) was released in May 2021. Produced by Anderson Entertainment, the audiobooks feature Jon Culshaw as the voices of Jeff Tracy and Parker, with Genevieve Gaunt as Lady Penelope.

Influence

Thunderbirds has influenced TV, cinema and other media. The 1960s sketch comedy Not Only... But Also included a segment called "Superthunderstingcar" — a parody of Thunderbirds, Supercar and Stingray. The puppet comedy of Team America: World Police was directly inspired by the idiosyncrasies of the Thunderbirds marionettes. Allusion and homage are also evident in the Wallace and Gromit short film A Close Shave, Austin Powers: The Spy Who Shagged Me and Spaced, as well as the character design of Star Wars: The Clone Wars.

International Rescue was the inspiration for the International Rescue Corps, a volunteer organisation started by a group of British firemen who contributed to the humanitarian effort following the 1980 Irpinia earthquake. Virgin Group used the series in the branding of its services: Virgin Atlantic flew a Boeing 747-400 called Lady Penelope and Virgin Trains operated a fleet of sixteen Class 57 rescue locomotives named after the main characters and vehicles.

Cover versions of "The Thunderbirds March" have been released by musicians and bands including Billy Cotton, Joe Loss, Frank Sidebottom, The Rezillos and The Shadows. Songs inspired by the series include Busted's "Thunderbirds / 3AM" (which forms part of the soundtrack of the 2004 film), "International Rescue" by Fuzzbox, "Thunderbirds Are Coming Out" by TISM, and "Thunderbirds – Your Voice" by V6. The music video for the Dire Straits single "Calling Elvis", directed by Gerry Anderson, featured a collection of Thunderbirds-style puppets.

A mime theatre show, Thunderbirds: F.A.B., has toured internationally and popularised a staccato style of movement known as the "Thunderbirds walk". It has been periodically revived as Thunderbirds: F.A.B. – The Next Generation.

During the 1960s, APF produced Thunderbirds-themed TV adverts for Kellogg's breakfast cereal and Lyons Maid ice lollies. Lyons' Fab lolly, introduced in 1967, was launched to capitalise on the series' success and originally used FAB 1, Lady Penelope and Parker in its branding. In later decades, Thunderbirds has been used in advertising for Kit Kat chocolate bars, Swinton Insurance, Specsavers and the Driver and Vehicle Licensing Agency.

The first annual "International Thunderbirds Day" was celebrated on 30 September 2017, the 52nd anniversary of the series' debut. To mark the event, Vue Cinemas hosted special Thunderbirds screenings in 52 locations around the UK, the Emirates Air Line cable car featured "Thunderbirds Are Go" branding, and the InterContinental London - The O2 hotel offered a "Lady Penelope Afternoon Tea" from 15 September until 30 October.

See also
List of early colour TV shows in the UK

Notes

References

Works cited
 
 Originally published as: 
 
 
 Originally published as: 
 
 
 
 
 
 
 
 

 
 Thunderbirds volume originally published separately as:

External links

  (requires Adobe Flash Player and QuickTime; page plays audio when loaded)
 
 
 

 
1960s British children's television series
1960s British science fiction television series
1965 British television series debuts
1966 British television series endings
Aviation television series
BBC Radio dramas
British children's action television series
British children's adventure television series
British children's science fiction television series
British television shows featuring puppetry
Disaster television series
English-language television shows
Espionage television series
Fictional works set in the Pacific Ocean
First-run syndicated television programs in the United States
ITV children's television shows
Marionette films
Space adventure television series
Television series about families
Television series by ITC Entertainment
Television series set in the 2060s
Television series set on fictional islands
Television shows adapted into comics
Television shows adapted into films
Television shows adapted into novels
Television shows adapted into plays
Television shows adapted into radio programs
Television shows adapted into video games
Television shows set in Kent
Television shows set in Malaysia
Underwater action films